Rosewood Hotels & Resorts is an international luxury hotel and resort company operating 28 hotels in 16 countries, currently owned by Hong Kong-based Rosewood Hotel Group (formerly New World Hospitality and rebranded in May 2013). It was founded in Dallas, Texas in 1979 by Caroline Rose Hunt, the daughter of oil tycoon H. L. Hunt. The company was sold by Rosewood Corp. and Maritz, Wolff & Co. in 2011 to New World Hospitality for $229 million, along with five of the properties that were sold for $570 million. Arranged by Perkins Coie, the $800 million deal was awarded “Merger & Acquisition of the Year 2011” by the Americas Lodging Investment Summit.

History 
Caroline Rose Hunt founded Rosewood in 1979, desiring to create residential-style luxury hotels that would provide guests with attentive personalized services. A year later, Hunt converted the mansion of Texas cotton magnate Sheppard King into Rosewood's first hotel, The Mansion on Turtle Creek, located in the upscale Turtle Creek neighborhood.

Acquisition by Rosewood Hotel Group 
Hong Kong-based company Rosewood Hotel Group (formerly New World Hospitality and rebranded in May 2013) is a subsidiary of Chow Tai Fook Enterprises, a privately owned Hong Kong-based company. Previously, Rosewood Hotel Group was the hotel management arm of New World China Land, a subsidiary of New World Group. The company announced in June 2011 that it had signed a purchase and sale agreement to acquire Rosewood Hotels & Resorts from Rosewood Corp. and Maritz, Wolff & Co. The Chief Executive Officer of Rosewood Hotel Group, Sonia Cheng, stated the deal "represents a strategic direction for our company to establish a robust presence in the international luxury hospitality arena and, particularly with our strong Asia base, Rosewood will be positioned for substantially accelerated global growth." She added that the company would "treasure and protect Rosewood's legacy, people and reputation" with Caroline Hunt, honorary chairperson of Rosewood Hotels & Resorts, saying it was a "source of satisfaction" that Rosewood would be joining a company that "appreciates the heritage of Rosewood and the values on which it was built." The deal was completed on July 29, 2011 with Rosewood Hotel Group stating in a press release that Rosewood would operate as the ultra-luxury brand of its business and that the company was looking to double the size of Rosewood's property portfolio within five years.

Chief executives 

 Robert D. Zimmer (1979–1988)
Denny Alberts (1988–1998)
James F. Brown (1998–2003)
 John M. Scott III (2003–2011)
 Sonia C.M. Cheng (2011– )

Properties and locations
Rosewood currently has 27 properties around the world, with a further 25 properties planned for opening in the future.

By Region

The Americas

United States (6 properties, 4 planned) 
The Carlyle, A Rosewood Hotel (New York City, New York)
Rosewood Mansion on Turtle Creek (Dallas, Texas)
Rosewood Inn of the Anasazi (Santa Fe, New Mexico)
Rosewood Sand Hill (Menlo Park, California)
Rosewood Washington, D.C. (Washington D.C.)
Rosewood Miramar Beach (Montecito, California)
 Kona Village, A Rosewood Resort (Kailua-Kona, Hawaii) – 2023
Rosewood Houston (Houston, Texas) – 2024
Rosewood San Francisco (San Francisco, California) – 2026
Rosewood The Raleigh Miami Beach (Miami, Florida) – opening date unknown

Canada (1 property) 
Rosewood Hotel Georgia (Vancouver, B.C.)

Mexico (3 properties, 2 planned) 
 Las Ventanas al Paraiso, A Rosewood Resort (Los Cabos, Mexico)
 Rosewood Mayakoba (Riviera Maya, Mexico)
 Rosewood San Miguel de Allende (San Miguel de Allende, Mexico)
Rosewood Mandarina (Riviera Nayarit, Mexico) – 2024
Rosewood Mexico City (Mexico City, Mexico) – 2024

Caribbean Atlantic (4 properties, 1 planned) 
 Rosewood Bermuda (Bermuda)
Rosewood Baha Mar (Nassau, Bahamas)
Rosewood Little Dix Bay (Virgin Gorda, British Virgin Islands)
Rosewood Le Guanahani St. Barth (St. Barthelemy, French West Indies)
 Rosewood Half Moon Bay (Half Moon Bay Beach, Antigua) – 2023

Brazil (1 property) 
 Cidade Matarazzo Rosewood São Paulo

Europe

European Union (4 properties, 6 planned) 
 Rosewood Castiglion del Bosco (Tuscany, Italy)
 Hôtel de Crillon, A Rosewood Hotel (Paris, France)
Rosewood Villa Magna (Madrid, Spain)
Rosewood Vienna (Vienna, Austria)
Rosewood Munich (Munich, Germany) – 2023
Rosewood Amsterdam (Amsterdam, the Netherlands) – 2023
Rosewood Schloss Fuschl (Fuschlsee, Austria) – 2023
Rosewood Rome (Rome, Italy) – 2024
Rosewood Hotel Bauer Venice (Venice, Italy) – 2025
Rosewood Milan (Milan, Italy) – 2025

United Kingdom (1 property, 1 planned) 
Rosewood London (London, England)
The Chancery Rosewood (London, England) – 2024

Middle East

United Arab Emirates (1 property) 
 Rosewood Abu Dhabi (Abu Dhabi, United Arab Emirates)

Saudi-Arabia (1 property, 2 planned) 
 Rosewood Jeddah (Jeddah, Saudi Arabia)
Rosewood Riyadh (Riyadh, Saudi-Arabia) – 2025
Rosewood Red Sea (Shura Island, Saudi-Arabia) – 2025

Qatar (1 planned) 
Rosewood Doha (Doha, Qatar) – 2023

Asia

Cambodia (1 property) 

 Rosewood Phnom Penh (Cambodia)

Greater China (4 properties, 7 planned) 

 Rosewood Beijing (Beijing, China)
 Rosewood Guangzhou (Guangzhou, China)
 Rosewood Sanya (Hainan, China)
 Rosewood Hong Kong (Hong Kong)
 Rosewood Ningbo (Ningbo, China) – 2023
 Rosewood Shenzhen (Shenzhen, China) – 2025
 Rosewood Chengdu (Chengdu, China) – 2026
 Rosewood Hangzhou (Hangzhou, China) – 2026
 Rosewood Xi’an (Xi’an, China) – 2026
 Rosewood Shanghai (Shanghai, China) – 2028
 Rosewood Chonqing (Chongqing, China) – 2030

Laos (1 property) 

 Rosewood Luang Prabang (Luang Prabang, Laos)

Thailand (2 properties) 

 Rosewood Bangkok (Bangkok, Thailand)
 Rosewood Phuket (Phuket, Thailand)

Philippines (1 planned) 

 Rosewood Hermana Mayor (Zambales Province, Philippines) – 2023

Vietnam (1 property) 

 Rosewood Hoi An (Hoi An, Vietnam) – 2020

Japan (1 planned) 

 Rosewood Miyakojima (Miyakojima, Japan) – 2024

References

External links 
 

Boutique resort chains
Hospitality companies of Hong Kong
Private equity portfolio companies